Utricularia tortilis is a small to medium-sized annual carnivorous plant that belongs to the genus Utricularia. It is endemic to tropical Africa and can be found in Angola, Botswana, Burundi, the Central African Republic, Côte d'Ivoire, the Democratic Republic of the Congo, Ghana, Guinea, Guinea-Bissau, Kenya, Liberia, Mali, Nigeria, the Republic of the Congo, Senegal, Sierra Leone, Tanzania, Togo, Uganda, Zambia, and Zimbabwe. It was originally described by Friedrich Welwitsch but validly published by Daniel Oliver in 1865.

See also 
 List of Utricularia species

References 

Carnivorous plants of Africa
Flora of Angola
Flora of Botswana
Flora of Burundi
Flora of Ivory Coast
Flora of Ghana
Flora of Guinea
Flora of Guinea-Bissau
Flora of Kenya
Flora of Liberia
Flora of Mali
Flora of Nigeria
Flora of Senegal
Flora of Sierra Leone
Flora of Tanzania
Flora of the Central African Republic
Flora of the Democratic Republic of the Congo
Flora of the Republic of the Congo
Flora of Togo
Flora of Uganda
Flora of Zambia
Flora of Zimbabwe
tortilis
Taxa named by Daniel Oliver